Charles Eyre may refer to:

Charles Eyre (died 1729), President of Bengal
Charles Eyre (bishop) (1817–1902), Archbishop of Glasgow
Charles Eyre (writer) (1784–1864), English writer